Living Hell may refer to:

 Living Hell (film), a 2008 American TV horror film
 "Living Hell" (The Outer Limits), a 1995 television episode
 Living Hell, a 2007 young adult novel by Catherine Jinks
 "Living Hell", a song by New Found Glory from Resurrection
 "Living Hell", a song by This Time Next Year from Drop Out of Life

See also
 Arkham Asylum: Living Hell, a DC Comics limited series
 Pain
 Punishment
 Suffering